Prud'homme is a village in the Canadian province of Saskatchewan within the Rural Municipality of Bayne No. 371 and Census Division No. 15. Prud'homme was first known by the name of Bluebell Ranch, then Lally Siding. In 1905 the Canadian Northern Railway came through and renamed it Marcotte's Crossing; two years later it became known as Howell; and finally, in 1922, it was named after the Suffragan Bishop of Prince-Albert–Saskatoon, Joseph H. Prud'homme. The community is mostly based on agriculture.

History 
Prud'homme incorporated as a village on November 15, 1922.

Demographics 

Notable people 

 Maurice Baudoux, Archbishop of Saint-Boniface
 Anthony Bidulka, author
 Jeanne Sauvé, Governor General of Canada 1984–1990, first woman in this office

See also 
 List of communities in Saskatchewan
 Villages of Saskatchewan

References

External links
2001 Community Profiles
GeoNames Query 
Online Historical Map Digitization Project
Post Offices and Postmasters - ArchiviaNet - Library and Archives Canada
Prud'homme Village Council
Saskatchewan Gen Web Region
Saskatchewan Gen Web - One Room School Project 
Saskatchewan Roman Catholic Churches ~ Online Parish Registers ~ History >> Howell / Prud'homme

Villages in Saskatchewan
Bayne No. 371, Saskatchewan
Division No. 15, Saskatchewan